Ilgiz Suleymanovich Fattakhov (born 7 March 1986) is a former Russian professional football player.

External links
 
 Career summary by sportbox.ru
 Profile at Lithuanian football portal

1986 births
Living people
Russian footballers
Association football midfielders
FBK Kaunas footballers
FK Šilutė players
FC Partizan Minsk players
A Lyga players
Belarusian Premier League players
Russian expatriate footballers
Expatriate footballers in Lithuania
Expatriate footballers in Belarus